Paraclinus mexicanus, the Mexican blenny, is a species of labrisomid blenny native to reefs of the Pacific coast of the Americas from Baja California, Mexico to Ecuador.  This species can reach a length of  TL.  It can also be found in the aquarium trade.

References

Further References

mexicanus
Fish described in 1904
Fish of the Pacific Ocean
Fish of Ecuador
Fish of Mexican Pacific coast